Lydia Rubio is a Cuban-American artist, born in La Habana, Cuba (1946).  After attending the University of Florida and Universita degli Studi di Firenze, she obtained a Master's in Architecture from the Harvard Graduate School of Design, where she pursued visual studies with Rudolf Arnheim.

Her work consists of paintings, unique journals and large site-specific installations.  She has been in more than 26 solo exhibitions, and participated in many group shows.  Rubio's works are in numerous private collections and institutions such as The Women's Center at Indiana University, Santa Barbara Museum of Art, Lehigh University, the Cintas Collection at Miami-Dade College, the Museum of Art Fort Lauderdale and the Lowe Art Museum.  Her artist books are in The Sackner Archive of Concrete Poetry, and in the libraries of Bryn Mawr College, Stanford, University of Southern California, University of Miami and the Wolfsonian at FIU.  She has completed public art commissions for Terminal C of Raleigh Durham Airport, The Women's Park  Miami-Dade County and the Disney Terminal at the Port of Miami.

Rubio has been awarded fellowships from Pollock Krasner, Cintas Foundation, the State of Florida and the Graham Foundation.  She taught a design studio for two years at Harvard GSD and was a full-time instructor for five years at the University of Puerto Rico.  At Parsons School of Design she developed the Visual Thinking Studio with the Department of Environmental Design over a three-year period.  She has been invited as visiting artist to several fine arts programs at Altos de Chavon, Dominican Republic, and in the State of Florida.  Rubio has lived in Cuba, Italy, Boston, New York City, Miami, Bogota and Puerto Rico.

Her work has been exhibited in New York, Montreal, Bogota and Miami. It has been featured in periodicals like Magazine of The Americas Society, ARTnews, The Miami Herald, El Nuevo Herald, Harvard GSD Magazine, Hemispheres Magazine, Southern Accents, Indulge Express and Elle Décor.

References

Artist's website

1946 births
Living people
20th-century Cuban women artists
21st-century Cuban women artists
Artists from Havana
Cuban contemporary artists
University of Florence alumni
University of Florida alumni
Harvard Graduate School of Design alumni